Rogale may refer to:

Rogale, Lublin Voivodeship (east Poland)
Rogale, Masovian Voivodeship (east-central Poland)
Rogale, Podlaskie Voivodeship (north-east Poland)
Rogale, Ełk County in Warmian-Masurian Voivodeship (north Poland)
Rogale, Gołdap County in Warmian-Masurian Voivodeship (north Poland)
Rogale, Szczytno County in Warmian-Masurian Voivodeship (north Poland)

See also
Rogal (disambiguation)